Santosh Gupta may refer to:

 Santosh Gupta (journalist) (1925–2004), Bangladeshi journalist and writer
 Santosh Kumar Gupta (born 1936), Indian Navy officer